Wang Zhenpeng; was a Chinese landscape painter who worked in the imperial court during the Yuan Dynasty (1271–1368). His specific dates of birth and death are not known, though he was active 1280–1329.

Wang was born in Yongjia in the Zhejiang province. His style name was 'Pengmei' (朋梅) and his pseudonym was 'Guyun chushi' (孤雲處士). Wang's painting of landscapes and follow in the style of Li Gongling in their ease and grace of appearance. His architecture drawings were mostly uncolored, in a fineline style known as 'jiehua' (界畫).

Notes

References
 Barnhart, R. M. et al. (1997). Three thousand years of Chinese painting. New Haven, Yale University Press. 
 Ci hai bian ji wei yuan hui (辞海编辑委员会）. Ci hai （辞海）. Shanghai: Shanghai ci shu chu ban she （上海辞书出版社）, 1979.

Year of death unknown
Yuan dynasty landscape painters
Artists from Wenzhou
Painters from Zhejiang
Year of birth unknown